Man of God is a title given to prophets and religious leaders of the Judeo-Christian tradition. The term may also refer to:
 "Man of God", a song by Audio Adrenaline from the album Bloom, 1995
 Man of God (2021 film), a film directed by Yelena Popovic
 Man of God (2022 film), a Nigerian film